The 1985 Nebraska Cornhuskers football team represented the University of Nebraska–Lincoln in the 1985 NCAA Division I-A football season. The team was coached by Tom Osborne and played their home games in Memorial Stadium in Lincoln, Nebraska.  The season opener against Florida State was the last season opening loss until 2015.

Schedule

Roster and coaching staff

Depth chart

Game summaries

Florida State

Both teams started out evenly with a 7-7 tie after the first quarter, but Florida State led the Cornhuskers by 4 at the half and no one scored during the rest of this scorcher, as the mercury in Lincoln reached 93 °F (and 133 °F on the field).  This was the last season opener Nebraska would lose until 2015.

Illinois

Although Illinois started out behind 0-17, they came within 7 points of a tie before Nebraska ran away, as the Cornhuskers at one point scored 28 straight in a game whose outcome never was seriously in doubt.

Oregon

Source: 

    
    
    
    
    
    
    
    

Oregon was rendered helpless in Lincoln as Nebraska punched in four touchdowns late in the 2nd quarter and rolled to a 63-0 shutout in Lincoln.  The Ducks only crossed the center of the field twice and were unable to scrape up even 1/3 of the total time of possession.

New Mexico

Nebraska closed out the non-conference season against a New Mexico team that was not intimidated in Lincoln.  The Lobos scored first and acquired 379 total yards of offense while winning the time of possession battle, but could not turn those accomplishments into scores as they also allowed nine sacks, four interceptions and lost a fumble.

Oklahoma State

Nebraska pulled off the upset of Oklahoma State in Stillwater, as The Cowboys' passing attack was no match for the Cornhuskers' rushing attack when it was hampered by OSU's two lost fumbles and two thrown interceptions.  Nebraska continued their unbeaten streak over Oklahoma State that began in 1961.

Missouri

21 of Nebraska's 28 points came off of the foot of PK Dale Klein, who not only tied the NCAA record of seven field goals in a game, but also became the first player to make seven straight in a game while also running his Nebraska field goal record streak up to nine.

Colorado

Colorado, playing without its 1st and 2nd string quarterbacks, still managed to hold Nebraska to a 7-7 halftime tie before a long touchdown run at the end of the 3rd quarter allowed the Cornhuskers to pull away.

Kansas State

Kansas State managed to prevent any single Nebraska runner from exceeding 100 yards, and even though Nebraska only completed six passes, it made no difference as the Wildcats were held to just a 1st-quarter field goal while the Cornhuskers had little trouble putting up 41 points.  Nebraska PK Dale Klein set a Nebraska and personal record when he kicked a 50-yard field goal, his 12th of the season.

Iowa State

The #3 Cornhuskers romped in Lincoln as the Blackshirts extended their touchdown prevention streak to 11 quarters.  Nebraska IB Doug DuBose entered record territory, becoming the 10th Nebraska player to post 2,000 yards, became the third (after Jarvis Redwine and Mike Rozier) to have two 1,000 yard seasons, and was the first Cornhusker to do so before their senior season.

Kansas

Despite a 0-6 turnover margin deficit, #2 Nebraska rolled the Kansas Jayhawks up in a 56-6 drubbing that saw the Cornhusker defense extend their touchdown-free series to 15 quarters.  Without the five lost fumbles and one interception given up by Nebraska, the blowout of Kansas would have been far worse.

Oklahoma

    
    
    
    
    
    

Oklahoma completely shut down Nebraska's offensive machine, as the Cornhuskers' only score came on a 76-yard fumble return for a touchdown with just 26 seconds left to play, very narrowly avoiding what would have been Nebraska's first shutout in 147 games.  There were only 19 total passes and 5 completions in the entire game, and although Nebraska had not previously allowed more than 157 ground yards this season, the vaunted Oklahoma wishbone attack netted the Sooners 423 yards.

Michigan

Although Nebraska led 14-3 going into halftime, turnover-free Michigan cashed in on each of several Cornhusker mistakes in the third quarter to run off 24 points and pull away, handing Nebraska its second consecutive defeat to a #5 team.

Rankings

After the season

Awards

NFL and pro players
The following Nebraska players who participated in the 1985 season later moved on to the next level and joined a professional or semi-pro team as draftees or free agents.

References

Nebraska
Nebraska Cornhuskers football seasons
Nebraska Cornhuskers football